Compassionate Action for Animals (CAA) is a Minneapolis-based animal advocacy non-profit focused on raising awareness on factory farming and promoting vegetarianism and veganism.

History
CAA was formed in early 1998 in order to pursue "strategic nonviolence" as a path towards animal rights. This is a strategy based on the principles of non-violent action defined by Gene Sharp. These principles of strategic non-violence are reflected in CAA's current core values.

The name Compassionate Action for Animals was adopted in May 1998. In June 1999, CAA became a 501(c)3 non-profit organization after merging with the Animal Liberation League, another local animal rights organization with a very similar approach and philosophy.

In 1999, CAA began working on its Ban Battery Cages campaign, which culminated in the open rescue of over ten egg-laying hens from a battery cage facility, the first such rescue in the US. CAA's investigation and rescue campaign was based on a similar campaign which was first done by Animal Liberation Victoria in Australia.

CAA is active as a student group at the University of Minnesota, Twin Cities campus, as well as at the Macalester College campus and in the larger Minneapolis-Saint Paul area. Its focus is on outreach, education and community-building events.

Activities and campaigns
 Outreach through tabling, leafleting, postering, cable shows, literature stands, writing letters and articles for publications, and more.
 Social events such as potlucks, movies, game nights and dine-outs.
 Food giveaways to show how delicious vegetarian and vegan food is.
 Speakers who address animal, ethical and health issues 
 Working with community restaurants and university cafeterias to make vegetarian and vegan dining more convenient and available.

Location
CAA has an office in the Whittier Neighborhood at 2100 First Ave South, Suite 200, Minneapolis, MN 55404

References

External links
 CAA's homepage
 CAA's worldwide guide to veg-friendly dining and shopping
 Contact information

Animal rights organizations
Organizations based in Minneapolis
Organizations established in 1998
Animal welfare organizations based in the United States
1998 establishments in Minnesota